Kelly Brown (born 13 November 1965) is a Canadian gymnast. She competed in six events at the 1984 Summer Olympics.

References

External links
 

1965 births
Living people
Canadian female artistic gymnasts
Olympic gymnasts of Canada
Gymnasts at the 1984 Summer Olympics
Sportspeople from London, Ontario